Lancaster Historic District may refer to, in the United States:
(by state)
 Lancaster Commercial Historic District (Lancaster, Kentucky), Lancaster, Kentucky, listed on the National Register of Historic Places (NRHP)
 Lancaster Historic District (Lancaster, Ohio), NRHP-listed
 Lancaster Methodist Episcopal Camp Ground Historic District, Lancaster, Ohio, listed on the NRHP in Fairfield County, Ohio
 Lancaster West Main Street Historic District, Lancaster, Ohio, listed on the NRHP in Fairfield County, Ohio
 Lancaster City Historic District, Lancaster, Pennsylvania, listed on the NRHP in Lancaster, Pennsylvania
 Lancaster Historic District (Lancaster, Pennsylvania), listed on the NRHP in Lancaster, Pennsylvania
 Northeast Lancaster Township Historic District, Lancaster, Pennsylvania, listed on the NRHP in Lancaster, Pennsylvania
 Lancaster Downtown Historic District, Lancaster, South Carolina, listed on the NRHP in Lancaster County, South Carolina
 Lancaster Court House Historic District, Lancaster, Virginia, NRHP-listed